Bruce Cameron may refer to:

Bruce Cameron (bishop) (born 1941), former bishop and Primus of the Scottish Episcopal Church
Bruce Cameron (guitarist) (1955–1999), American guitarist
Bruce Cameron (weightlifter) (born 1941/42), New Zealand weightlifter
W. Bruce Cameron (born 1960), American humor columnist

See also
Cameron Bruce (born 1979), Australian rules footballer